The women's 1500 metres event at the 1994 European Athletics Indoor Championships was held in Palais Omnisports de Paris-Bercy on 13 March.

Results

References

1500 metres at the European Athletics Indoor Championships
1500
1994 in women's athletics